Zoë Avril (born 7 October 1980) is a French musician from Nantes. Her debut eponymous album was released in April 2008, which peaked at number 74 on the French albums chart. She has also been the subject of a series on M6 and W9,  (Zoë Avril's World). She was discovered on the internet by Jury Jeunes Talents, organised by French mobile operator, SFR, before being signed to Mercury Records.

References

External links
 Official site

1980 births
Avril, Zoe
Musicians from Nantes
Living people
20th-century French women singers
21st-century French women singers